Boiga schultzei, commonly known as the Schultze's blunt-headed tree snake, is a species of snake in the family Colubridae. The species is endemic to the Philippines.

Etymology
The specific name, schultzei, is in honor of Willie Schultze in whose private collection E.H. Taylor found the specimen which would become the holotype.

Geographic range
B. schultzei is found on the island of Palawan, Philippines.

Habitat

Description

Diet
B. schultzei preys upon lizards, such as the gecko Gehyra mutilata.

ReproductionB. schultzei is oviparous.

References

Further reading
Greene HW (1989). "Ecological, evolutionary, and conservation implications of feeding biology of Old World cat snakes, genus Boiga (Colubridae)". Proceedings of the California Academy of Sciences, Fourth Series 46 (8): 193–207. (Boiga schultzei, p. 197).
Taylor EH (1923). "Additions to the herpetological fauna of the Philippine Islands, III". Philippine Journal of Science 22: 515–557 + Plates 1–3. (Boiga schultzei, new species, pp. 552–553 + Plate 3, figure 3).
Weinell JL, Hooper E, Leviton AE, Brown RM (2019). "Illustrated Key to the Snakes of the Philippines" Proc. California Acad. Sci., Fourth Series'' 66 (1): 1–49.

Reptiles described in 1923
Reptiles of the Philippines
schultzei